The Weihe Viaduct (German: Weihetalbrücke) is a bridge of the A 4 motorway near Richelsdorf, Germany. It is located in the stretch of the A 4 between Bad Hersfeld (Hesse) and Eisenach (Thuringia), between the exits Wildeck-Obersuhl and Gerstungen. It crosses the valley of the small river Weihe.

The bridge was intended to have been built at the beginning of the 1940s, but it wasn't finished then: only a few columns were built. Instead for the motorway a provisional route through the valley was constructed. In the 50 years to follow its construction was cancelled due to its location near the former border between the German Democratic Republic and the Federal Republic of Germany. After the 1990 German reunification, traffic increased considerably, and in 1992 construction of a new bridge was started. One of the old columns was kept as a monument. The new bridge (45 million DM construction costs) was inaugurated in 1994. It is a prestressed concrete bridge of 584 m, which rest on 8 columns.

Buildings and structures in Hesse
Bridges completed in 1994
Road bridges in Germany
Viaducts in Germany
1994 establishments in Germany